The president of Portugal, officially the president of the Portuguese Republic, is the head of state and highest office of Portugal.

The powers, functions and duties of prior presidential offices, and their relation with the prime minister and cabinets have over time differed with the various Portuguese constitutions. Currently, in the Third Republic, a semi-presidential system, the President holds no direct executive power, but is more than a merely ceremonial figure as is typically the case with parliamentary systems: one of his most significant responsibilities is the promulgation of all laws enacted by the Assembly of the Republic (parliament) or the Government (an act without which such laws have no legal validity), with an alternative option to veto them (although this veto can be overcome in the case of laws approved by Parliament) or send them to the Constitutional Court for appreciation of whether they violate the Constitution. This and other abilities imply that the president of Portugal does not fit clearly into either of the three traditional powers – legislative, executive and judicial –, acting instead as a sort of "moderating power" among the traditional three.

The current President of Portugal is Marcelo Rebelo de Sousa, who took office on 9 March 2016.

Role 

The Portuguese Third Republic is a semi-presidential system. Unlike most European presidents, who are largely ceremonial figures, the Portuguese president is invested with more extensive powers. Although it is the prime minister of Portugal and parliament that oversee and direct much of the nation's actual governmental affairs, the Portuguese president wields significant influence and authority, especially in the fields of national security and foreign policy (but still less than "strong" semi-presidential systems, such as France or Romania). The president is the supreme commander of the Armed Forces, holds the nation's most senior office, and outranks all other politicians.

The president's greatest power is his ability to appoint the prime minister. However, since the Assembly of the Republic has the sole power to dismiss the prime minister's government, the prime minister named by the president must have the confidence of a majority of representatives in the assembly, otherwise the prime minister may face a motion of no confidence. The president has the discretionary power to dissolve parliament when he sees fit (colloquially known as the "atomic bomb" in Portugal), and President Jorge Sampaio made use of this prerogative in late 2004 to remove the controversial government of Pedro Santana Lopes, despite the absolute majority of deputies supporting the government. In 2003, President Sampaio also intervened to limit the Portuguese participation in the Iraq War – as Supreme Commander of the Armed Forces he forbade the deployment of the Portuguese Army in a war that he personally disagreed with, clashing with the then–prime minister José Manuel Barroso. Becaused of this, the Government eventually deployed 128 members of the National Republican Guard (GNR)  to Iraq from 2003 to 2005, this being possible because the GNR, despite being a military force, was not part of the Armed Forces.

Prior to the Carnation Revolution, the powers of the presidency varied widely; some presidents were virtual dictators (such as Pais, and Carmona in his early years), while others were little more than figureheads (such as Carmona in his later years, Craveiro Lopes, and Américo Tomás; during their administrations, supreme power was held by António de Oliveira Salazar, the President of the Council of Ministers).

Powers 
The constitution grants the following powers to the president:

The President of the Republic exercises the functions of Supreme Commander of the Armed Forces and Grand Master of the Three Orders, and appoints and dismisses, on a proposal from the Government, the Chief of the General Staff of the Armed Forces and the heads of General Staff of the three branches of the Armed Forces.
The President of the Republic can dissolve the Assembly of the Republic, which implies the need to call new legislative elections and, after these have been held, the resignation of the Government.
The President of the Republic appoints the Prime Minister taking into account the electoral results and appoints the remaining members of the Government on the proposal of the Prime Minister. The President can, on the other hand, dismiss the Government when this becomes necessary to ensure the regular functioning of democratic institutions.
The governing bodies of the autonomous regions may be dissolved by the President of the Republic, for carrying out serious acts contrary to the Constitution.
The President of the Republic declares the state of siege and emergency, after hearing the Government and under authorization from the Assembly of the Republic.
Upon a proposal from the Government and with authorization from the Assembly of the Republic, the President of the Republic may declare war in the event of effective or imminent aggression and make peace.
The President of the Republic promulgates or signs and, consequently, can veto the promulgation or signature of laws, decree-laws, regulatory decrees and other Government decrees.
In the domain of his competences in international relations, the President of the Republic ratifies international treaties.
The President of the Republic decides on the convening of the referendum whose holding is proposed by the Assembly of the Republic.
The President of the Republic may request the Constitutional Court to pre-empt the constitutionality of norms contained in international conventions or decrees that have been sent to him for promulgation as an organic law, law or decree-law.
The President of the Republic appoints and exonerates, in some cases on a proposal from the Government, holders of important State bodies such as the Representatives of the Republic for the autonomous regions, the President of the Court of Auditors and the Attorney General of the Republic, five members of the Council of State and two members of the Superior Council of the Judiciary.
The President of the Republic appoints the ambassadors and extraordinary envoys, on a proposal from the Government, and accredits the foreign diplomatic representatives.
The President of the Republic, after hearing the Government, pardons and commutes sentences.

Election 
Under the Portuguese Constitution adopted in 1976, in the wake of the 1974 Carnation Revolution, the president is elected to a five-year term; there is no limit to the number of terms a president may serve, but a president who serves two consecutive terms may not serve again in the next five years after the second term finishes or in the following five years after his resignation. The official residence of the Portuguese president is the Belém Palace.

The president is elected in a two-round system: if no candidate reaches 50% of the votes during the first round, the two candidates with the most votes face each other in a second round held two weeks later. However, the second round has only been needed once, during the 1986 presidential election. To date, all of the elected presidents since the Carnation Revolution have served for two consecutive terms, and presidents consistently rank as the most popular political figure in the country. During his time in office, however, the popularity of former president Aníbal Cavaco Silva plummeted, making him the second-least popular political figure in the country, just above the then-prime minister, and the first Portuguese president after 1974 to have a negative popularity.

Under article 132 of the Constitution, if the president dies or becomes incapacitated while in office, the president of the Assembly assumes the office with restricted powers until a new president can be inaugurated following fresh elections.

2021 presidential election

|-
!style="background-color:#E9E9E9;text-align:left;" colspan="2" rowspan="2"|Candidates 
!style="background-color:#E9E9E9;text-align:left;" rowspan="2"|Supporting parties 	
!style="background-color:#E9E9E9;text-align:right;" colspan="2"|First round
|-
!style="background-color:#E9E9E9;text-align:right;"|Votes
!style="background-color:#E9E9E9;text-align:right;"|%
|-
|style="width: 10px" bgcolor=#FF9900 align="center" | 
|align=left|Marcelo Rebelo de Sousa
|align=left|Social Democratic Party, People's Party
|align="right" |2,531,692
|align="right" |60.66
|-
|style="width: 5px" bgcolor=#FF66FF align="center" | 
|align=left|Ana Gomes
|align=left|People–Animals–Nature, LIVRE
|align="right" |540,823
|align="right" |12.96
|-
|style="width: 5px" bgcolor=#202056 align="center" | 
|align=left|André Ventura
|align=left|CHEGA
|align="right" |497,746
|align="right" |11.93
|-
|style="width: 5px" bgcolor=red align="center" | 
|align=left|João Ferreira
|align=left|Portuguese Communist Party, Ecologist Party "The Greens"
|align="right" |179,764
|align="right" |4.31
|-
|style="width: 5px" bgcolor= align="center" | 
|align=left|Marisa Matias
|align=left|Left Bloc, Socialist Alternative Movement
|align="right" |165,127
|align="right" |3.96
|-
|style="width: 5px" bgcolor=#00ADEF align="center" | 
|align=left|Tiago Mayan Gonçalves
|align=left|Liberal Initiative
|align="right" |134,991
|align="right" |3.23
|-
|style="width: 5px" bgcolor=LightSeaGreen align="center" | 
|align=left|Vitorino Silva
|align=left|React, Include, Recycle
|align="right" |123,031
|align="right" |2.95
|-
|colspan="3" align=left style="background-color:#E9E9E9"|Total valid
|width="65" align="right" style="background-color:#E9E9E9"|4,173,174
|width="40" align="right" style="background-color:#E9E9E9"|100.00
|-
|align=right colspan="3"|Blank ballots
|width="65" align="right" |47,164
|width="40" align="right" |1.11
|-
|align=right colspan="3" |Invalid ballots
|width="65" align="right"|38,018
|width="40" align="right"|0.89
|-
|colspan="3" align=left style="background-color:#E9E9E9"|Total
|width="65" align="right" style="background-color:#E9E9E9"|4,258,356
|width="40" align="right" style="background-color:#E9E9E9"|
|-
|colspan=3|Registered voters/turnout
||10,847,434||39.26
|-
|colspan=5 align=left|Source: Comissão Nacional de Eleições
|}

Graphical timeline (since 1910)

State visits

See also
Politics of Portugal

Notes

References

External links 
 

 
1910 establishments in Portugal